Copelatus ogasawarensis is a species of diving beetle. It is part of the genus Copelatus in the subfamily Copelatinae of the family Dytiscidae. It was described by Kamiya in 1932.

References

ogasawarensis
Beetles described in 1932